Neprošteno is a village in the municipality of Tearce, North Macedonia.

History

According to Bulgarian ethnographer Vasil Kanchov in 1900 the village was home to 680 inhabitants of which 580 were Bulgarian and 100 Albanian.

According to revolutionary and ethnographer Gyorche Petrov Neprošteno is divided by a small river into 2 mahalas, one Bulgarian the other inhabited by Albanians who were famous for banditry. The Bulgarian mahala is on the right side and the Albanian on the left side of the river, the village exported beans, fruit but most famously chestnuts, and had two churches, one old and one new.

During the inter-ethnic conflict in 2001 4 ethnic Macedonian inhabitants of the village were kidnapped by the NLA whose whereabouts are unknown to this day.

Demographics
According to the 2002 census, the village had a total of 1,309 inhabitants. Ethnic groups in the village include:

Albanians 898
Macedonians 405
Serbs 2
Others 4

References

External links

Villages in Tearce Municipality
Albanian communities in North Macedonia